Mount Curl is the snow-covered summit of a ridge located  east-northeast of Gatlin Peak, just northeast of the Welch Mountains in Palmer Land. It was mapped by the United States Geological Survey in 1974, and named by the Advisory Committee on Antarctic Names for James E. Curl, a United States Antarctic Research Program glaciologist in the South Shetland Islands, 1971–72, 1972–73 and 1973–74.

References 

Mountains of Palmer Land